Richmond, also known as Richmond (London), is a National Rail station in Richmond, Greater London on the Waterloo to Reading and North London Lines.

Architecture
The station building, designed by James Robb Scott in Portland stone and dating from 1937, is in Art Deco style and its facade includes a square clock. The area in front of the station main entrance was pedestrianised in 2013 and includes a war memorial to soldier Bernard Freyberg, who was born in Richmond.

History
This station was on a site to the south of the present through platforms, which later became a goods yard and where a multi-storey car park now stands. The Windsor, Staines and South Western Railway (WS&SWR) extended the line westward, resiting the station to the west side of The Quadrant, on the extended tracks and slightly west of the present through platforms. Both the R&WER and WS&SWR were subsidiary companies of the London and South Western Railway (L&SWR).

On 1 January 1869, the L&SWR opened the Kensington and Richmond line from north of Addison Road station (now Kensington (Olympia) station) on the West London Joint Railway. Most of this line is now part of the London Underground District line; the line south from Gunnersbury was also served by the North London Railway (NLR) and is now used also by London Overground. Before this line was built, services north from Richmond ran somewhat circuitously via chords at Kew Bridge and Barnes.

On 1 June 1877, the District Railway (DR) linked its then terminus at Hammersmith to the nearby L&SWR tracks east of the present  station. The DR began running trains over the L&SWR tracks to Richmond. On 1 October 1877, the Metropolitan Railway (MR, now the Metropolitan line) restarted the former GWR service to Richmond via Grove Road station.

The DR route from Richmond to central London via Hammersmith was more direct than those of the NLR via , of the L&SWR and the MR via Grove Road station and of the L&SWR via Clapham Junction to Waterloo. From 1 January 1894, the GWR began sharing the MR Richmond service, resulting in Gunnersbury having the services of five operators.

The DR ran electric trains on the branch, while the L&SWR, NLR, GWR and MR services continued to be steam hauled.

MR services ceased on 31 December 1906 and those of the GWR on 31 December 1910, leaving operations northwards through Kew Gardens and Gunnersbury to the DR, the NLR and L&SWR. On 3 June 1916, the L&SWR withdrew its service from Richmond to Addison Road through Hammersmith due to competition from the District line, leaving the District as the sole operator over that route and the NLR providing main line services via Willesden Junction.

Under the grouping of 1923, the L&SWR became part of the Southern Railway (SR) and the NLR became part of the London, Midland and Scottish Railway (LMS); both were subsequently nationalised into British Railways. On 1 August 1937, the SR opened its rebuilt station with the station building and the through platforms moved east to be next to the terminal platforms. At around the same time, the SR moved the goods yard from the site of the original terminus to a new location north-east of the station.

Accident
On 18 September 1987, an accident occurred at Richmond when a westbound District line hit the buffers of platform 6 and broke the glass/perspex panels behind. No passengers were seriously injured.

Crossrail
A Crossrail branch to Kingston upon Thames via Richmond was proposed in 2003, but was dropped in 2004 due to a combination of local opposition, complex choices and engineering at the start of the route, cost, and insufficient return on investment.

Platforms

The station has seven platforms numbered from south to north:
 Platforms 1 and 2 are through platforms for South Western Railway services.
 Platforms 3 to 7 are terminating platforms used by:
 London Overground North London line services (normally platforms 3 and 4 but sometimes 5, 6 and 7)
 London Underground District line services (normally platforms 5, 6 and 7. Occasionally 4 but never 3 due to 3's lack of a fourth rail, which the District Line uses for electric power).

As of September 2011, work was under way to extend platforms 1 and 2 to accept 10-car trains. The bulk of the lengthening was to be at the west (country) end; extending eastwards was deemed unviable by Network Rail as Church Road Bridge would have needed widening. As part of these works, the platform canopies were also being refurbished.

The wide gap between platforms 3 and 4 originally had a third, run-around track for steam locomotives.

Eight retail units are at the station: four eatery-cafés on alternate sides of the barriers (two on the rail side being thin and smaller) similarly two kiosks, the upper one being a hot drinks kiosk through to a M&S Simply Food grocery store. A florist and a WH Smith flank the entrance.

Off peak service
The typical off-peak service in trains per hour is:

 2 fast calling at  only
 4 all stations
  8 direct from Waterloo (South Western Railway)
 2 to 
 2 to 
 2 indirectly returning to Waterloo via Hounslow and Brentford
 2 indirectly returning to Waterloo via Kingston and Wimbledon
 6 to  via  (District line)

Transport links
London Buses serving nearby are:

A taxi rank is near the station entrance on Kew Road. Steps or lifts can be used to reach all platforms.

An extensive bike storage facility is east outside the back entrance, Church Road, linked by 27 steps to a set of ticket barriers and the main platform area connecting platforms 2–7.

References

External links

 Transport for London Richmond station 

Art Deco railway stations
District line stations
Former London and South Western Railway stations
Railway stations in the London Borough of Richmond upon Thames
Railway stations in Great Britain opened in 1846
Railway stations served by London Overground
Railway stations served by South Western Railway
Tube stations in the London Borough of Richmond upon Thames
Richmond, London
1846 establishments in England
James Robb Scott buildings
Art Deco architecture in London